Trans Am may refer to:

 Pontiac Firebird Trans Am, an automobile model
 Trans Am (band), an American post-rock band
 Trans Am (album), their 1996 debut album
 Trans Am (1996 song), their eponymous song from the eponymous album, see Trans Am (album)
 "Trans Am" (song), a 2015 song by Thompson Square
 Trans-Am Series, an American automobile racing series
 Trans Am Bike Race, an annual cycling race across the United States
 Tranz Am, a 1983 video game
 "Trans Am", a song by Neil Young from the album Sleeps with Angels

See also
 Transamerica (disambiguation)
 Across America (disambiguation)